Tuksar-e Shijan (also Romanized as Tūksar-e Shījān; also known as Nūksar and Sheyjān) is a village in Chapar Khaneh Rural District, Khomam District, Rasht County, Gilan Province, Iran. At the 2006 census, its population was 187, in 73 families.

References 

Populated places in Rasht County